KWJZ-LP (107.3 FM) is a radio station licensed to serve High Rock, Washington, United States. The station is owned by Continental Broadcasting. The station was originally located in Fall City, hence the original call letters. The station was originally on 104.5 FM.

The station was assigned the KWJZ-LP call letters by the Federal Communications Commission on December 12, 2012.

See also
 KYA Radio

References

External links
 

WJZ-LP
WJZ-LP
Radio stations established in 2005
2005 establishments in Washington (state)
Oldies radio stations in the United States